This was the first edition of the event as a WTA International tournament.

Raquel Kops-Jones and Abigail Spears won the title, defeating Jocelyn Rae and Anna Smith in the final, 3–6, 6–3, [11–9].

Seeds

Draw

References 
 Main draw

Nottingham Open - Doubles
Nottingham Open